Sahotra, also Sihota is  Jat Sikh, native to the Punjab region and hilly regions of India and Pakistan. The Sahotas are prevalent in the Hoshiarpur district.

Notable people with this surname include:
 Gadowar Singh Sahota (born 1954), Indian professional wrestler known as Gama Singh
 Harvinder Sahotra (born 1941), Indian American cardiologist
 Sahotas, U.K. based Bhangra/Rock/World music band
 Mukhtar Sahota, British music composer and producer
 Onkar Sahota, British Labour Party politician
 Patty Sahota, Canadian politician
 Ruby Sahota, Canadian Liberal politician
 Sunjeev Sahota (born 1981), British novelist

See also 
Sahotra

References

See also 
Sutradhar (caste)

Punjabi tribes